Kim Su-ji (born 16 February 1998) is a South Korean diver. She competed in the 10-metre platform event at the 2012 Summer Olympics. The youngest member of the South Korean contingent at the Olympics that year, she lives in Ulsan, where she graduated from Guyeong Primary School and went on to Cheonsang Middle School. She won a bronze medal along with Cho Eun-bi in the women's 10-metre synchronised platform event at the 2013 East Asian Games in Tianjin.

She acquired 8th position in 2018 Asian Games Women's 3-metre springboard and won a bronze medal in 1 metre springboard.

References

External links

South Korean female divers
Divers at the 2012 Summer Olympics
Olympic divers of South Korea
1998 births
Living people
Sportspeople from Seoul
Asian Games medalists in diving
Divers at the 2014 Asian Games
Divers at the 2018 Asian Games
Universiade medalists in diving
Asian Games bronze medalists for South Korea
Medalists at the 2018 Asian Games
Universiade bronze medalists for South Korea
World Aquatics Championships medalists in diving
Medalists at the 2017 Summer Universiade
Divers at the 2020 Summer Olympics
21st-century South Korean women